William Bond (September 8, 1625–December 14, 1695) was the first Speaker of the Massachusetts Province House of Representatives in 1692 following unification of Plymouth Colony and Massachusetts Bay Colony in 1691, he was the representative for Watertown a position he would be elected to several times after.

Early life
Bond was baptized September 8, 1625 in England, the son of Thomas Bond. He may have come to the American colonies in 1630 with his aunt Elizabeth, the wife of Deacon Ephraim Child, or he may have come at a later date. (See Robert Charles Anderson, The Great Migration Begins, Immigrants to New England, 1620–1633, 3 vols. (Boston: New England Historic Genealogical Society, 1995), 2098).  In 1649 he married Sarah Biscoe, daughter of tanner Nathanial Biscoe, and were the parents of seven children.

Public service
Bond became a leading citizen of Massachusetts Bay, serving as a selectman and town clerk of Watertown, captain of the militia, Justice of the Peace, and member of the Council of Safety.

Speaker of the House
Following the unification of Massachusetts Bay and Plymouth in 1691 by the Second Royal Charter, William became the first speaker, holding the office in 1692-1693 and 1695.

Belmont
The Bond farm was purchased from some of William Bond's descendants by China merchant John Perkins Cushing. Cushing used it as his estate where he built a mansion which he named Belmont. When the northern part of Watertown seceded they chose to name the town Belmont, Massachusetts after Cushing's estate there.

References

1625 births
1695 deaths
Kingdom of England emigrants to Massachusetts Bay Colony
People from Watertown, Massachusetts
Speakers of the Massachusetts House of Representatives
People of colonial Massachusetts